Nyitra County was an administrative county (comitatus) of the Kingdom of Hungary. Its territory lay in what is now western Slovakia.

Geography

Nyitra County shared borders with the Austrian land Moravia and Trencsén County, Turóc County, Bars County, Komárom County and Pozsony County. In its final phase, it was a strip of land between the Morava river in the north and the town of Érsekújvár (present-day Nové Zámky) in the south, plus an outlier around the town of Privigye (present-day Prievidza). The river Vág (present-day Váh) flowed through the county. Its area was 5519 km2 around 1910.

Capitals
The capital of the county was the Nitra Castle and since the Late Middle Ages the town of Nyitra (present-day Nitra).

History
A predecessor to Nyitra county may have existed as early as in the 9th century at the time of Great Moravia. Around 1000, Nyitra county arose as one of the first comitatus of the Kingdom of Hungary. The southern part, including the town Nyitra, was ruled as Uyvar Province between 1663 and 1685 by Ottoman Empire. The county shortly ceased to exist as a separate administrative unit between 1850 and 1860, when it was split into Upper Nyitra County (including Bán district from Trencsén County) and Lower Nyitra County (including Oszlány district from Bars County).

After World War I, Nyitra county became part of newly formed Czechoslovakia. Nitra county (Nitrianska župa) continued to exist within its original borders until 1923, when it was replaced by so-called "Nitra Great County", officially The County XIV. (Nitrianska). In 1928, Nitra County was abolished like all other counties in Slovakia. During the First Slovak Republic the county was shortly restored (1940-1945), however without southern parts became part of Hungary in November 1938, as a result of the First Vienna Award.

Demographics

Subdivisions

In the early 20th century, the subdivisions of Nyitra county were:

Notes

References

States and territories established in 1860
States and territories disestablished in 1850
States and territories disestablished in 1920
Counties in the Kingdom of Hungary